Ben Karlin (born c. 1971) is an American television producer and writer. He has won eight Emmy awards, and is best known for his work in The Daily Show with Jon Stewart and The Colbert Report. He is one of three co-creators of The Colbert Report along with Stephen Colbert and Jon Stewart. Karlin left Comedy Central in December 2006. He has also been a writer for TV show Modern Family. 

Karlin was tapped to serve as writer, producer and showrunner of a new TV series set within the Marvel Cinematic Universe titled Damage Control, based on the Marvel Comics' team with the same name. The series was ordered by ABC Network for consideration in 2017, but not picked up.

His book, released February 2008, is a collection of essays entitled Things I've Learned From Women Who've Dumped Me.  It contains essays by Andy Richter, Will Forte, David Wain, Stephen Colbert, Patton Oswalt, Bob Odenkirk, and many others. Karlin is also the co-editor of America (The Book) alongside Jon Stewart and David Javerbaum. He wrote for Space Ghost: Coast to Coast and The Onion from 1993-1996.

Early life
Ben Karlin was born and raised in Needham, Massachusetts. He is an alumnus of University of Wisconsin–Madison, where he majored in journalism and served as a reporter at the 1992 Summer Olympics in Barcelona. At The Onion Karlin is credited with coining the term "Area Man". After leaving The Onion, he moved to Los Angeles and worked as a script doctor for movies, including Ice Age, Monkeybone and Titan A.E..

Career
In his post-The Daily Show life, Karlin filed a lawsuit against Frappe Inc. for backing out of a book contract connected to a TV show hosted by Mario Batali and Gwyneth Paltrow. In a counter-complaint filed on behalf of Frappe, Inc., e-mails are revealed as court evidence in which Ben Karlin is self-described as an “asshole” and “difficult.” Additionally, Karlin has been involved in public conflicts with creative peers/partners such as Benjamin Wallace over ownership of production rights to a wine-fraud related movie.

In August 2007, Karlin signed a deal with HBO to produce series, specials, and telepics under the banner of Picturehouse and Karlin's own company, Superego Industries. In December 2008 it was revealed that SuperEgo Industries was the company behind WonderGlen, a comedy website purporting to be the company intranet for an eccentric group of Los Angeles TV and film producers.

References

External links

 in 2009
 From the Onion to Comedy Central to the Oscars...
  Article about Karlin
 Audio interview with Karlin on public radio program The Sound of Young America
 Interview with Karlin about leaving the Daily Show and his 2008 book Things I’ve Learned From Women Who’ve Dumped Me. From the University of Wisconsin–Madison's alumni magazine.
 Interview with Karlin about the WonderGlen project from Xconomy

American television writers
American male television writers
Emmy Award winners
Living people
People from Needham, Massachusetts
University of Wisconsin–Madison School of Journalism & Mass Communication alumni
Screenwriters from Massachusetts
Year of birth missing (living people)